Martin Périgny is the mayor of the parish municipality of Hérouxville, Quebec. He attracted national and international media attention in January 2007, when the municipality passed the controversial Hérouxville Standards declaration concerning immigration to the community.

External links
  Municipality of Hérouxville

Mayors of places in Quebec
Living people
Year of birth missing (living people)
Place of birth missing (living people)
21st-century Canadian politicians